Yanova could refer to the following places:

Ineu in Romania
Janjevo in Kosovo
 Jonava in Lithuania